

Events

Pre-1600
 537 – Siege of Rome: King Vitiges attempts to assault the northern and eastern city walls, but is repulsed at the Praenestine Gate, known as the Vivarium, by the defenders under the Byzantine generals Bessas and Peranius.
 630 – Emperor Heraclius returns the True Cross, one of the holiest Christian relics, to Jerusalem.
 717 – Battle of Vincy between Charles Martel and Ragenfrid.
1152 – Annulment of the marriage of King Louis VII of France and Queen Eleanor of Aquitaine.
1180 – Emperor Antoku accedes to the throne of Japan.
1556 – On the day of his execution in Oxford, former archbishop of Canterbury Thomas Cranmer deviates from the scripted sermon by renouncing the recantations he has made and adds, "And as for the pope, I refuse him, as Christ's enemy, and Antichrist with all his false doctrine."

1601–1900
1788 – A fire in New Orleans leaves most of the town in ruins.
1800 – With the church leadership driven out of Rome during an armed conflict, Pius VII is crowned Pope in Venice with a temporary papal tiara made of papier-mâché.
1801 – The Battle of Alexandria is fought between British and French forces near the ruins of Nicopolis near Alexandria in Egypt.
1804 – Code Napoléon is adopted as French civil law.
1814 – Napoleonic Wars: Austrian forces repel French troops in the Battle of Arcis-sur-Aube.
1821 – Greek War of Independence: Greek revolutionaries seize Kalavryta. 
1844 – The Baháʼí calendar begins. This is the first day of the first year of the Baháʼí calendar. It is annually celebrated by members of the Baháʼí Faith as the Baháʼí New Year or Náw-Rúz.
1861 – Alexander Stephens gives the Cornerstone Speech.
1871 – Otto von Bismarck is appointed as the first Chancellor of the German Empire.
  1871   – Journalist Henry Morton Stanley begins his trek to find the missionary and explorer David Livingstone.

1901–present
1918 – World War I: The first phase of the German Spring Offensive, Operation Michael, begins.
1919 – The Hungarian Soviet Republic is established becoming the first Communist government to be formed in Europe after the October Revolution in Russia.
1921 – The New Economic Policy is implemented by the Bolshevik Party in response to the economic failure as a result of war communism.
1925 – The Butler Act prohibits the teaching of human evolution in Tennessee.
  1925   – Syngman Rhee is removed from office after being impeached as the President of the Provisional Government of the Republic of Korea.
1928 – Charles Lindbergh is presented with the Medal of Honor for the first solo trans-Atlantic flight.
1935 – Shah of Iran Reza Shah Pahlavi formally asks the international community to call Persia by its native name, Iran.
1937 – Ponce massacre: Nineteen unarmed civilians in Ponce, Puerto Rico are gunned down by police in a terrorist attack ordered by the US-appointed Governor, Blanton C. Winship.
1943 – Wehrmacht officer Rudolf von Gersdorff plots to assassinate Adolf Hitler by using a suicide bomb, but the plan falls through; von Gersdorff is able to defuse the bomb in time and avoid suspicion.
1945 – World War II: British troops liberate Mandalay, Burma.
  1945   – World War II: Operation Carthage: Royal Air Force planes bomb Gestapo headquarters in Copenhagen, Denmark. They also accidentally hit a school, killing 125 civilians.
  1945   – World War II: Bulgaria and the Soviet Union successfully complete their defense of the north bank of the Drava River as the Battle of the Transdanubian Hills concludes.
1946 – The Los Angeles Rams sign Kenny Washington, making him the first African American player in professional American football since 1933.
1952 – Alan Freed presents the Moondog Coronation Ball, the first rock and roll concert, in Cleveland, Ohio.
1960 – Apartheid: Sharpeville massacre, South Africa: Police open fire on a group of black South African demonstrators, killing 69 and wounding 180.
1963 – Alcatraz Federal Penitentiary (in California) closes.
1965 – Ranger program: NASA launches Ranger 9, the last in a series of unmanned lunar space probes.
  1965   – Martin Luther King Jr. leads 3,200 people on the start of the third and finally successful civil rights march from Selma to Montgomery, Alabama.
1968 – Battle of Karameh in Jordan between the Israel Defense Forces and the combined forces of the Jordanian Armed Forces and PLO.
1970 – The first Earth Day proclamation is issued by Joseph Alioto, Mayor of San Francisco.
  1970   – San Diego Comic-Con, the largest pop and culture festival in the world, hosts its inaugural event.
1980 – Cold War: U.S. President Jimmy Carter announces a United States boycott of the 1980 Summer Olympics in Moscow to protest the Soviet–Afghan War.
1983 – The first cases of the 1983 West Bank fainting epidemic begin; Israelis and Palestinians accuse each other of poison gas, but the cause is later determined mostly to be psychosomatic.
1986 – Debi Thomas became the first African American to win the World Figure Skating Championships
1989 – Transbrasil Flight 801 crashes into a slum near São Paulo/Guarulhos International Airport, killing 25 people.
1990 – Namibia becomes independent after 75 years of South African rule.
1994 – The United Nations Framework Convention on Climate Change enters into force.
1999 – Bertrand Piccard and Brian Jones become the first to circumnavigate the Earth in a hot air balloon.
2000 – Pope John Paul II makes his first ever pontifical visit to Israel.
2006 – The social media site Twitter is founded.
2019 – The 2019 Xiangshui chemical plant explosion occurs, killing at least 47 people and injuring 640 others.
2022 – China Eastern Airlines Flight 5735 crashes in Guangxi, China, killing 132 people.

Births

Pre-1600
 927 – Emperor Taizu of Song (d. 976)
1474 – Angela Merici, Italian educator and saint (d. 1540)
1501 – Anne Brooke, Baroness Cobham, English noble (d. 1558)
1521 – Maurice, Elector of Saxony (d. 1553)
1527 – Hermann Finck, German composer and educator (d. 1558)
1555 – John Leveson, English politician (d. 1615)
1557 – Anne Howard, Countess of Arundel, English countess and poet (d. 1630)

1601–1900
1626 – Peter of Saint Joseph Betancur, Spanish saint and missionary (d. 1667)
1672 – Stefano Benedetto Pallavicino, Italian poet and translator (d. 1742)
1685 – Johann Sebastian Bach, German Baroque composer and musician (d. 1750)
1713 – Francis Lewis, Welsh-American merchant and politician (d. 1803)
1716 – Josef Seger, Bohemian organist, composer, and educator (d. 1782)
1752 – Mary Dixon Kies, American inventor (d. 1837)
1763 – Jean Paul, German journalist and author (d. 1825)
1768 – Joseph Fourier, French mathematician and physicist (d. 1830)
1802 – Augusta Waddington, Welsh writer and patron of the arts (d. 1896)
1806 – Benito Juárez, Mexican lawyer and politician, 25th President of Mexico (d. 1872)
1811 – Nathaniel Woodard, English priest and educator (d. 1891)
1825 – Alexander Mozhaysky, Russian soldier and engineer (d. 1890)
1831 – Dorothea Beale, English suffragist, educational reformer and author (d. 1906)
1835 – Thomas Hayward, English cricketer (d. 1876)
1839 – Modest Mussorgsky, Russian pianist and composer (d. 1881)
1854 – Alick Bannerman, Australian cricketer and coach (d. 1924)
1857 – Alice Henry, Australian journalist and activist (d. 1943)
1859 – Daria Pratt, American golfer (d. 1938)
1865 – George Owen Squier, American general (d. 1934)
1866 – Antonia Maury, American astronomer and astrophysicist (d. 1952)
1867 – Florenz Ziegfeld, Jr., American director and producer (d. 1932)
1869 – David Robertson, Scottish-English golfer and rugby player (d. 1937)
1874 – Alfred Tysoe, English runner (d. 1901)
1876 – Walter Tewksbury, American runner and hurdler (d. 1968)
1877 – Maurice Farman, French race car driver and pilot (d. 1964)
1878 – Morris H. Whitehouse, American architect (d. 1944)
1880 – Broncho Billy Anderson, American actor, director, and producer (d. 1971)
  1880   – Hans Hofmann, German-American painter and academic (d. 1966)
1882 – Aleksander Kesküla, Estonian politician (d. 1963)
1884 – George David Birkhoff, American mathematician (d. 1944)
1885 – Pierre Renoir, French actor and director (d. 1952)
1886 – Walter Dray, American pole vaulter (d. 1973)
1887 – Clarice Beckett, Australian painter (d. 1935)
  1887   – Lajos Kassák, Hungarian poet, novelist and painter (d. 1967)
  1887   – M. N. Roy, Indian philosopher and politician (d. 1954)
1889 – Jock Sutherland, American football player and coach (d. 1948)
1896 – Friedrich Waismann, Austrian mathematician, physicist, and philosopher from the Vienna Circle (d. 1959)
1897 – Sim Gokkes, Dutch composer and conductor (d. 1943)
  1897   – Salvador Lutteroth, Mexican wrestling promoter, founded Consejo Mundial de Lucha Libre (d. 1987)
1899 – Panagiotis Pipinelis, Greek politician, Prime Minister of Greece (d. 1970)

1901–present
1901 – Karl Arnold, German businessman and politician, President of the German Bundesrat (d. 1958)
1902 – Son House, American blues singer-songwriter and guitarist (d. 1988)
1904 – Jehane Benoît, Canadian journalist and author (d. 1987)
  1904   – Forrest Mars, Sr., American candy maker, created M&M's and Mars bar (d. 1999)
  1904   – Nikos Skalkottas, Greek violinist and composer (d. 1949)
1905 – Phyllis McGinley, American author and poet (d. 1978)
1906 – John D. Rockefeller III, American philanthropist (d. 1978)
  1906   – Jim Thompson, American businessman (d. 1967)
  1906   – André Filho, Brazilian musician and songwriter (d. 1974)
1907 – Zoltán Kemény, Hungarian sculptor (d. 1965)
1909 – Harry Lane, English footballer (d. 1977)
1910 – Julio Gallo, American businessman, co-founded E & J Gallo Winery (d. 1993)
  1910   – Muhammad Siddiq Khan, Bangladeshi librarian and educator (d. 1978)
1911 – Walter Lincoln Hawkins, African-American scientist and inventor (d. 1992)
1912 – André Laurendeau, Canadian journalist, playwright, and politician (d. 1968)
1913 – George Abecassis, English race car driver and pilot (d. 1991)
  1913   – Guillermo Haro, Mexican astronomer (d. 1988)
1914 – Paul Tortelier, French cellist and composer (d. 1990)
1916 – Bismillah Khan, Indian shehnai player (d. 2006)
  1916   – Ken Wharton, English race car driver (d. 1957)
1917 – Frank Hardy, Australian journalist, author, and playwright (d. 1994)
1918 – Patrick Lucey, American captain and politician, 38th Governor of Wisconsin (d. 2014)
  1918   – Charles Thompson, American pianist and composer (d. 2016)
1919 – Douglas Warren, Australian bishop (d. 2013)
1920 – Manolis Chiotis, Greek singer-songwriter and bouzouki player (d. 1970)
  1920   – Éric Rohmer, French director, film critic, journalist, novelist and screenwriter (d. 2010)
1921 – Arthur Grumiaux, Belgian violinist and pianist (d. 1986)
  1921   – Antony Hopkins, English pianist, composer, and conductor (d. 2014)
1922 – Russ Meyer, American director, producer, and screenwriter (d. 2004)
1923 – Louis-Edmond Hamelin, Canadian geographer, author, and academic (d. 2020)
  1923   – Nizar Qabbani, Syrian poet, publisher, and diplomat (d. 1998)
  1923   – Nirmala Srivastava, Indian religious leader, founded Sahaja Yoga (d. 2011)
  1923   – Rezső Nyers, Hungarian politician (d. 2018)
1924 – Philip Abbott, American actor (d. 1998)
  1924   – Dov Shilansky, Lithuanian-Israeli lawyer and politician (d. 2010)
1925 – Harold Ashby, American saxophonist (d. 2003)
  1925   – Peter Brook, English-French director and producer (d. 2022)
  1925   – Hugo Koblet, Swiss cyclist (d. 1964)
1926 – André Delvaux, Belgian director and screenwriter (d. 2002)
1927 – Halton Arp, American-German astronomer and critic (d. 2013)
  1927   – Hans-Dietrich Genscher, German soldier and politician, Vice-Chancellor of Germany (d. 2016)
1928 – Surya Bahadur Thapa, Nepalese politician, 24th Prime Minister of Nepal (d. 2015)
1929 – Maurice Catarcio, American wrestler (d. 2005)
1930 – James Coco, American actor (d. 1987)
  1930   – Otis Spann, American blues pianist, singer and composer (d. 1970)
1931 – Toyonobori, Japanese sumo wrestler (d. 1998)
  1931   – Clark L. Brundin, American-English engineer and academic (d. 2021)
  1931   – Catherine Gibson, Scottish swimmer (d. 2013)
  1931   – Al Williamson, American illustrator (d. 2010)
1932 – Walter Gilbert, American physicist and chemist, Nobel Prize laureate
  1932   – Joseph Silverstein, American violinist and conductor (d. 2015)
1933 – John Hall, English businessman
  1933   – Michael Heseltine, Welsh businessman and politician, Deputy Prime Minister of the United Kingdom
1934 – Al Freeman, Jr., American actor and director (d. 2012)
1935 – Brian Clough, English footballer and manager (d. 2004)
1936 – Ed Broadbent, Canadian pilot and politician
  1936   – Mike Westbrook, English pianist and composer 
1937 – Ann Clwyd, Welsh journalist and politician, Shadow Secretary of State for Wales
  1937   – Tom Flores, American football player and coach
  1937   – Pierre-Jean Rémy, French diplomat and author (d. 2010)
1938 – Michael Foreman, English author and illustrator
  1938   – Grahame Thomas, Australian cricketer
1939 – Kathleen Widdoes, American actress
1940 – Solomon Burke, American singer-songwriter (d. 2010)
  1940   – Andrea Elle, German bicyclist 
1942 – Françoise Dorléac, French actress (d. 1967)
  1942   – Kostas Politis, Greek basketball player and coach (d. 2018)
  1942   – Amina Claudine Myers, African-American singer-songwriter and pianist
  1942   – Patcha Ramachandra Rao, India metallurgist, educator and administrator (d. 2010)
1943 – István Gyulai, Hungarian sprinter and sportscaster (d. 2006)
  1943   – Hartmut Haenchen, German conductor
  1943   – Vivian Stanshall, English singer-songwriter, guitarist, and painter (d. 1995)
1944 – Marie-Christine Barrault, French actress
  1944   – Janet Daley, American-English journalist and author
  1944   – Hideki Ishima, Japanese guitarist 
  1944   – Mike Jackson, English general
  1944   – David Lindley, American guitarist, songwriter, and producer (d. 2023)
  1944   – Gaye Adegbalola, African-American singer and guitarist 
1945 – Anthony Grabiner, Baron Grabiner, English lawyer
  1945   – Charles Greene, American sprinter and coach
  1945   – Rose Stone, African-American R&B singer and keyboard player
1946 – Timothy Dalton, Welsh-English actor
  1946   – Ray Dorset, English singer-songwriter and guitarist
  1946   – Joseph Mitsuaki Takami, Japanese cardinal
1947 – George Johnston, Scottish footballer 
1948 – Scott Fahlman, American computer scientist and academic
1949 – Alvin Kallicharran, Guyanese cricketer and coach
  1949   – Andy Love, Scottish-English politician
  1949   – Eddie Money, American singer-songwriter and guitarist (d. 2019)
  1949   – Slavoj Žižek, Slovenian sociologist, philosopher, and academic
1950 – Roger Hodgson, English singer-songwriter and keyboard player 
  1950   – Ron Oden, American minister and politician, 19th Mayor of Palm Springs
  1950   – Sergey Lavrov, Russian politician and diplomat, Russian Minister of Foreign Affairs
1951 – Conrad Lozano, American bass player 
  1951   – Russell Thompkins Jr., American soul singer
1953 – Steve Furber, English computer scientist and academic
  1953   – Paul Martin Lester, American photographer, author, and educator
  1953   – David Wisniewski, English-American author and illustrator (d. 2002)
1954 – Prayut Chan-o-cha, Thai politician, Prime Minister of Thailand
1955 – Fadi Abboud, Lebanese economist and politician
  1955   – Jair Bolsonaro, Brazilian politician and retired military officer, 38th President of Brazil
  1955   – Bob Bennett, American singer-songwriter and guitarist
  1955   – Dimitrios Papadimoulis, Greek politician
  1955   – Bärbel Wöckel, East German sprinter
1956 – Dick Beardsley, American runner
  1956   – Guy Chadwick, German-English singer-songwriter and guitarist
  1956   – Richard H. Kirk, English guitarist, keyboard player, composer, and producer (d. 2021)
  1956   – Ingrid Kristiansen, Norwegian runner
1958 – Marlies Göhr, German sprinter
  1958   – Brad Hall, American comedian, director, and screenwriter
  1958   – Gary Oldman, English actor, filmmaker, musician and author
1959 – Sarah Jane Morris, English singer-songwriter
  1959   – Yuval Rotem, Israeli diplomat
  1959   – Nobuo Uematsu, Japanese keyboard player and composer
1960 – Marwan Farhat, Syrian actor and voice actor
  1960   – Benito T. de Leon, Filipino general
  1960   – Raivo Puusepp, Estonian architect
  1960   – Ayrton Senna, Brazilian race car driver (d. 1994)
  1960   – Robert Sweet, American drummer and producer
1961 – Lothar Matthäus, German footballer and manager
  1961   – Gary O'Reilly, English footballer 
  1961   – Kassie DePaiva, American actress
  1961   – Slim Jim Phantom, American rock drummer
  1961   – Kim Turner, American hurdler
1962 – Matthew Broderick, American actor
  1962   – Kathy Greenwood, Canadian actress and screenwriter
  1962   – Rosie O'Donnell, American actress, producer, and talk show host
  1962   – Mark Waid, American author
1963 – Shawon Dunston, American baseball player
  1963   – Ronald Koeman, Dutch footballer and manager
  1963   – Shawn Lane, American guitarist, songwriter, and producer (d. 2003)
  1963   – Share Pedersen, American bass player 
1964 – Ieuan Evans, Welsh rugby player
  1964   – Jesper Skibby, Danish cyclist
1965 – Xavier Bertrand, French businessman and politician, French Minister of Social Affairs
  1965   – Thomas Frank, American author, historian and political analyst 
1966 – Benito Archundia, Mexican footballer, referee, lawyer, and economist
  1966   – Hauke Fuhlbrügge, German runner
  1966   – Matthew Maynard, English cricketer and coach 
  1966   – Moa Matthis, Swedish author
1967 – Carwyn Jones, Welsh lawyer and politician, First Minister of Wales
  1967   – Mirela Rupic, American costume and fashion designer
1968 – Cameron Clyne, Australian businessman
  1968   – Andrew Copeland, American singer and guitarist
  1968   – Gary Walsh, English football coach and former footballer
  1968   – Greg Ellis, English actor, producer, and screenwriter
  1968   – Tolunay Kafkas, Turkish footballer and manager
  1968   – Scott Williams, American basketball player and sportscaster
1969 – Jonah Goldberg, American journalist and author
1970 – Shiho Niiyama, Japanese voice actress (d. 2000)
  1970   – Cenk Uygur, Turkish-American political activist
1971 – Zsolt Kürtösi, Hungarian decathlete
1972 – Chris Candido, American wrestler (d. 2005)
  1972   – Balázs Kiss, Hungarian hammer thrower
  1972   – Derartu Tulu, Ethiopian runner
  1972   – Graeme Welch, English cricketer
1973 – Ananda Lewis, American television host
  1973   – Stuart Nethercott, English footballer and manager 
  1973   – Large Professor, American rapper and producer 
1974 – Rhys Darby, New Zealand comedian and actor
  1974   – Dejima Takeharu, Japanese sumo wrestler
  1974   – Edsel Dope, American singer-songwriter and producer 
  1974   – Ted Kravitz, British presenter and Formula One pit-lane reporter
  1974   – Kevin Leahy, American drummer 
  1974   – Conor Woodman, Irish journalist and author
1975 – Yacoub Al-Mohana, Kuwaiti director and producer
  1975   – Corné Krige, South African rugby player
  1975   – Fabricio Oberto, Argentinian-Italian basketball player
  1975   – Vitaly Potapenko, Ukrainian basketball player and coach
  1975   – Mark Williams, Welsh snooker player
1976 – Rachael MacFarlane, American voice actress and singer
  1976   – Bamboo Mañalac, Filipino singer-songwriter and guitarist 
  1976   – Tekin Sazlog, German-Turkish footballer
1977 – Bruno Cirillo, Italian footballer
  1977   – Jamie Delgado, English tennis player
1978 – Sally Barsosio, Kenyan runner
  1978   – Charmaine Dragun, Australian journalist (d. 2007)
  1978   – Kevin Federline, American dancer and television personality
  1978   – Cristian Guzmán, Dominican baseball player
  1978   – Joyce Jimenez, Filipino movie and TV actress
  1978   – Mohammad Rezaei, Iranian wrestler
1980 – Ronaldinho, Brazilian footballer
  1980   – Marit Bjørgen, Norwegian skier
  1980   – Lee Jin, South Korean singer and actress 
  1980   – Deryck Whibley, Canadian singer-songwriter, guitarist, and producer 
1981 – Germano Borovicz Cardoso Schweger, Brazilian footballer
  1981   – Sébastien Chavanel, French cyclist
  1981   – Glenn Hall, Australian rugby league player
  1981   – Jason King, Australian rugby league player
  1981   – Todd Polglase, Australian rugby league player
1982 – Maria Elena Camerin, Italian tennis player
  1982   – Ejegayehu Dibaba, Ethiopian runner
  1982   – Aaron Hill, American baseball player
  1982   – Colin Turkington, Northern Irish race car driver
1983 – Lucila Pascua, Spanish basketball player
  1983   – Jean Ondoa, Cameroonian footballer
1984 – Tiago dos Santos Roberto, Brazilian footballer
  1984   – Guillermo Daniel Rodríguez, Uruguayan footballer
1985 – Ryan Callahan, American ice hockey player
  1985   – Adrian Peterson, American football player
1986 – Scott Eastwood, American actor
  1986   – Michu, Spanish footballer
  1986   – Romanos Alyfantis, Greek swimmer
  1986   – Nikoleta Kyriakopoulou, Greek pole vaulter
1987 – Carlos Carrasco, Venezuelan baseball pitcher
1988 – Kateřina Čechová, Czech sprinter
  1988   – Erik Johnson, American ice hockey player
  1988   – Eric Krüger, German sprinter
  1988   – Michael Madl, Austrian footballer 
1989 – Jordi Alba, Spanish footballer
  1989   – Nicolás Lodeiro, Uruguayan footballer
  1989   – Takeru Satoh, Japanese actor
1990 – Mandy Capristo, German singer-songwriter and dancer 
  1990   – Ryann Krais, American runner and heptathlete
  1990   – Alex Nimo, Liberian-American soccer player
1991 – Luke Chapman, English footballer
  1991   – Antoine Griezmann, French footballer
1992 – Lehlogonolo Masalesa, South African footballer
  1992   – Karolína Plíšková, Czech tennis player
  1992   – Kristýna Plíšková, Czech tennis player
1993 – Jake Bidwell, English footballer
  1993   – Jesse Joronen, Finnish footballer
1994 – Margaret Lu, American fencer
1996 – Aurora Mikalsen, Norwegian footballer
1997 – Martina Stoessel, Argentine actress 
2000 – Jace Norman, American actor
2003 – Natalie Garcia, Canadian rhythmic gymnast

Deaths

Pre-1600
 543 or 547 – Benedict of Nursia, Italian saint (b. 480)
 867 – Ælla, king of Northumbria
   867   – Osberht, king of Northumbria
1034 – Ezzo, Count Palatine of Lotharingia (b. 955)
1063 – Richeza of Lotharingia (b. 995)
1076 – Robert I, Duke of Burgundy (b. 1011)
1201 – Absalon, Danish archbishop (b. c. 1128)
1306 – Robert II, Duke of Burgundy (b. 1248)
1372 – Rudolf VI, Margrave of Baden
1487 – Nicholas of Flüe, Swiss monk and saint (b. 1417)
1540 – John de Vere, 15th Earl of Oxford, English peer and courtier (b. c. 1482)
1556 – Thomas Cranmer, English archbishop (b. 1489)
1571 – Odet de Coligny, French cardinal and Protestant (b. 1517)

1601–1900
1617 – Pocahontas, Algonquian Indigenous princess (b. c. 1595)
1653 – Tarhoncu Ahmed Pasha, Albanian politician, Grand Vizier of the Ottoman Empire
1656 – James Ussher, Irish archbishop (b. 1581)
1676 – Henri Sauval, French historian and author (b. 1623)
1729 – John Law, Scottish-French economist and politician, Controller-General of Finances (b. 1671)
  1729   – Elżbieta Sieniawska, politically influential Polish magnate (b. 1669)
1734 – Robert Wodrow, Scottish historian and author (b. 1679)
1751 – Johann Heinrich Zedler, German publisher (b. 1706)
1752 – Gio Nicola Buhagiar, Maltese painter (b. 1698)
1762 – Nicolas Louis de Lacaille, French priest, astronomer, and academic (b. 1713)
1772 – Jacques-Nicolas Bellin, French geographer and cartographer (b. 1703)
1795 – Giovanni Arduino, Italian miner and geologist (b. 1714)
1801 – Andrea Luchesi, Italian composer and educator (b. 1741)
1804 – Louis Antoine, Duke of Enghien (b. 1772)
1843 – Robert Southey, English poet, historian, and translator (b. 1774)
  1843   – Guadalupe Victoria, Mexican general and politician, 1st President of Mexico (b. 1786)
1854 – Pedro María de Anaya, Mexican soldier. President (1847-1848) (b. 1795)
1863 – Edwin Vose Sumner, American general (b. 1797)
1869 – Juan Almonte, son of José María Morelos, was a Mexican soldier and diplomat who served as a regent in the Second Mexican Empire (1863-1864) (b. 1803)
1884 – Ezra Abbot, American scholar and academic (b. 1819)
1891 – Joseph E. Johnston, American general (b. 1807)

1901–present
1915 – Frederick Winslow Taylor, American golfer, tennis player, and engineer (b. 1856)
1920 – Evelina Haverfield, British suffragette and aid worker (b. 1867)
1927 – Thomas Oikonomou, Greek actor (b. 1864)
1934 – Franz Schreker, Austrian composer and conductor (b. 1878)
  1934   – Lilyan Tashman, American actress (b. 1896)
1936 – Alexander Glazunov, Russian composer and conductor (b. 1865)
1939 – Evald Aav, Estonian composer and conductor (b. 1900)
  1939   – Ali Hikmet Ayerdem, Turkish general and politician (b. 1877)
1943 – Cornelia Fort, American soldier and pilot (b. 1919)
1945 – Arthur Nebe, German SS officer (b. 1894)
1951 – Willem Mengelberg, Dutch conductor and composer (b. 1871)
1953 – Ed Voss, American basketball player (b. 1922)
1956 – Hatı Çırpan, Turkish politician (b. 1890)
1958 – Cyril M. Kornbluth, American soldier and author (b. 1923)
1970 – Manolis Chiotis, Greek singer-songwriter and bouzouki player (b. 1920)
1975 – Joe Medwick, American baseball player and coach (b. 1911)
1978 – Cearbhall Ó Dálaigh, President of Ireland (b. 1911)
1980 – Peter Stoner, American mathematician and astronomer (b. 1888)
1985 – Michael Redgrave, English actor, director, and manager (b. 1908)
1987 – Walter L. Gordon, Canadian accountant, lawyer, and politician, 22nd Canadian Minister of Finance (b. 1906)
  1987   – Robert Preston, American captain, actor, and singer (b. 1918)
1991 – Vedat Dalokay, Turkish architect and politician, Mayor of Ankara (b. 1927)
  1991   – Leo Fender, American businessman, founded Fender Musical Instruments Corporation (b. 1909)
1992 – John Ireland, Canadian-American actor and director (b. 1914)
  1992   – Natalie Sleeth, American pianist and composer (b. 1930)
1994 – Macdonald Carey, American actor (b. 1913)
  1994   – Lili Damita, French-American actress and singer (b. 1904)
  1994   – Aleksandrs Laime, Latvian-born explorer (b. 1911) 
1997 – Wilbert Awdry, English cleric and author, created The Railway Series, the basis for Thomas the Tank Engine (b. 1911)
1998 – Galina Ulanova, Russian ballerina (b. 1910)
1999 – Jean Guitton, French philosopher and author (b. 1905)
  1999   – Ernie Wise, English comedian and actor (b. 1925)
2001 – Chung Ju-yung, South Korean businessman, founded Hyundai (b. 1915)
  2001   – Anthony Steel, English actor and singer (b. 1920)
2002 – Herman Talmadge, American lieutenant, lawyer, and politician, 70th Governor of Georgia (b. 1913)
2003 – Shivani, Indian author (b. 1923)
  2003   – Umar Wirahadikusumah, Indonesian general and politician, 4th Vice President of Indonesia (b. 1924)
2004 – Ludmilla Tchérina, French actress, dancer, and choreographer (b. 1924)
2005 – Barney Martin, American police officer and actor (b. 1923)
  2005   – Bobby Short, American singer and pianist (b. 1924)
2007 – Drew Hayes, American author and illustrator (b. 1969)
  2007   – Sven O. Høiby, Norwegian hurdler and journalist (b. 1936)
2008 – Denis Cosgrove, English-American geographer and academic (b. 1948)
  2008   – Guillermo Jullian de la Fuente, Chilean architect and academic (b. 1931)
  2008   – John List, American murderer (b. 1925)
2009 – Mohit Sharma, Indian army officer (b. 1978)
2009 – Walt Poddubny, Canadian ice hockey player and coach (b. 1960)
2010 – Wolfgang Wagner, German director and manager (b. 1919)
2011 – Loleatta Holloway, American singer-songwriter (b. 1946)
  2011   – Gerd Klier, German footballer (b. 1944)
  2011   – Ladislav Novák, Czech footballer and manager (b. 1931)
  2011   – Pinetop Perkins, American singer and pianist (b. 1913)
2012 – Albrecht Dietz, German economist and businessman (b. 1926)
  2012   – Ron Erhardt, American football player and coach (b. 1931)
  2012   – Robert Fuest, English director, screenwriter, and production designer (b. 1927)
  2012   – Tonino Guerra, Italian poet and screenwriter (b. 1920)
  2012   – Irving Louis Horowitz, American sociologist, author, and academic (b. 1929)
  2012   – Yuri Razuvaev, Russian chess player and trainer (b. 1945)
  2012   – Marina Salye, Russian geologist and politician (b. 1934)
2013 – Chinua Achebe, Nigerian novelist, poet, and critic (b. 1930)
  2013   – Rick Hautala, American author and screenwriter (b. 1949)
  2013   – Harlon Hill, American football player and coach (b. 1932)
  2013   – Pietro Mennea, Italian sprinter and politician (b. 1952)
  2013   – Giancarlo Zagni, Italian director and screenwriter (b. 1926)
2014 – Qoriniasi Bale, Fijian lawyer and politician, 25th Attorney-General of Fiji (b. 1929)
  2014   – Bill Boedeker, American football player and soldier (b. 1924)
  2014   – Jack Fleck, American golfer (b. 1921)
  2014   – Simeon Oduoye, Nigerian police officer and politician (b. 1945)
  2014   – James Rebhorn, American actor (b. 1948)
  2014   – Ignatius Zakka I Iwas, Iraqi patriarch (b. 1933)
2015 – Ishaya Bakut, Nigerian general and politician, Governor of Benue State (b. 1947)
  2015   – Chuck Bednarik, American lieutenant and football player (b. 1925)
  2015   – James C. Binnicker, American sergeant (b. 1938)
  2015   – Hans Erni, Swiss painter, sculptor, and illustrator (b. 1909)
  2015   – Jørgen Ingmann, Danish singer and guitarist (b. 1925)
  2015   – Alberta Watson, Canadian actress (b. 1955)
2017 – Chuck Barris, American game show host and producer (b. 1929)
  2017   – Colin Dexter, English author (b. 1930)
  2017   – Martin McGuinness, Irish republican and deputy First Minister of Northern Ireland (b. 1950)
  2017   – Mike Hall, British cyclist  (b. 1981)
2019 – Victor Hochhauser CBE, British music promoter (b. 1923)
  2019   – Gonzalo Portocarrero, Peruvian sociologist (b. 1949)
2021 – Nawal El Saadawi, Egyptian secularist, feminist (b. 1931)

Holidays and observances
Arbor Day (Portugal)
Birth of Benito Juárez, a Fiestas Patrias (Mexico)
 Christian feast day:
Benedetta Cambiagio Frassinello
Passing of Saint Benedict (Order of Saint Benedict, pre-1970 Calendar)
Birillus
Enda of Aran
Nicholas of Flüe
Serapion of Thmuis
Thomas Cranmer (Anglicanism)
March 21 (Eastern Orthodox liturgics)
Education Freedom Day
Harmony Day (Australia)
Human Rights Day (South Africa)
Independence Day, celebrates the independence of Namibia from South African mandate in 1990
International Colour Day (International)
International Day for the Elimination of Racial Discrimination (International)
International Day of Forests (International), by proclamation of the United Nations General Assembly
Mother's Day (most of the Arab world)
National Tree Planting Day (Lesotho)
Newroz (Iran, Kurdistan, Mesopotamia)
Oltenia Day (Romania)
Rosie the Riveter Day (United States)
Truant's Day (Poland, Faroe Islands)
Vernal equinox related observances (see March 20)
World Down Syndrome Day (International)
World Poetry Day (International)
World Puppetry Day (International)
Youth Day (Tunisia)

References

External links

 BBC: On This Day
 
 Historical Events on March 21

Days of the year
March